The Russian Journal of Communication is an English-language, scholarly, peer-reviewed journal which covers topics related to journalism, public relations, film, and political communications in or involving Russia. Published by Taylor & Francis, it is indexed in Scopus. Its editor is Igor Klyukanov of Eastern Washington University and the journal is sponsored by the Russian Communication Association.

External links

Russian studies
Communication journals
Taylor & Francis academic journals